Heart of Love is a 2017 Polish drama film directed by Łukasz Ronduda.

Plot
The film is set in twenty-first century Poland. The film's protagonist, Zuzanna Bartoszek, played by Justyna Wasilewska experiences an affair with a narcissist. Both as artists, experiment with love and emotion, exploring sexual dominance along with their artistic ventures.

Cast
Justyna Wasilewska as Zuzanna Bartoszek
Jacek Poniedziałek as Wojciech Bąkowski 
Magdalena Cielecka as the curator
Patryk Pniewski as Zuzanna's friend

References

2017 films
2017 drama films
Polish drama films
2010s Polish-language films